Brachodes pumila is a moth of the family Brachodidae. It is found from eastern Central Europe to Central Asia, including lower Austria, Slovakia, Hungary, Romania, Bulgaria, Italy, Dalmatia, Croatia, North Macedonia, Greece, southern Russia, Turkey, Syria, Kazakhstan, Kyrgyzstan and north-western China. The habitat consists of lowland steppe and xero-montane grasslands.

The wingspan is 18–22 mm for males and 16–21 mm for females. The forewing ground colour is blackish, densely covered with olive-yellow scales. The hindwings are black with a white transverse band subbasally. Adults are day-active and are on wing from June to mid-August.

References

Moths described in 1808
Brachodidae
Moths of Europe
Moths of Asia